Sterling Hershey  is a full-time architect and freelance game designer, who has worked on three different incarnations of the Star Wars role-playing game for West End Games, Wizards of the Coast and Fantasy Flight Games, and also on the Star Wars Miniatures game. He has pursued freelance writing and cartography work since the early 1990s.

His Dungeons & Dragons credits include Monster Manual V (2007) and Monster Vault (2010).

His screen name is SilverForce on both StarWars.com and the Wizards boards.

Star Wars bibliography

Books

Star Wars d6 - West End Games
Flashpoint! Brak Sector 
Shadows of the Empire Planets Guide 
The Kathol Rift 
Hideouts & Strongholds 
The Far Orbit Project (cartographer)

Star Wars Saga Edition
Knights of the Old Republic Campaign Guide 
Force Unleashed Campaign Guide 
The Clone Wars Campaign Guide 
Legacy Era Campaign Guide
Rebellion Era Campaign Guide 
Scavenger's Guide to Droids

Star Wars Roleplaying Game 
 Age of Rebellion, 2014
 Force and Destiny, 2015

Articles
 Talnar's Rescue 
Raiding Sunfire Outpost 
Han Solo vs. the Death Star 
Talnar's Tatooine Traitor 
 Droidworks Assault 
Hired Guns 
 Repel Boarders 
Execute Order 66 
Vader's Pursuit 
Tusken Rustlers 
Power Beyond Belief 
 The Core of Corruption 
 Iridonian Darkness 
 25 to Rescue

Media Mentions
Sterling Hershey has appeared in the following newspaper and magazine articles, websites and podcasts.

Podcasts
 Order 66 podcast: Sterling has appeared on the following twelve episodes discussing aspects of the Star Wars Saga Edition roleplaying game: September 1, 2008  (Of U-Hauls, Fences and Silver Chocolate), January 12, 2009  (One Year of the Big O!), March 22, 2009  (Three Men and a Little Legacy).

References

External links
  Sterling Hershey's home page
 Delusions of Grandeur Sterling Hershey's Star Wars Blog
 
 Sterling Hershey's Blog at wizards.com
 Sterling Hershey Product Listing on RPG.net

Dungeons & Dragons game designers
Living people
Year of birth missing (living people)